The Baden mutiny was the third act of the Baden Revolution it lasted from 9 May – 23 July 1849.

On 11 May, the third Baden uprising began with the mutiny of Baden troops in the federal Rastatt Fortress.

Battles
Battle of Heppenheim
Battle of Weinheim
Battle of Wald-Michelbach
Battle of Ludwigshafen
Battle of Käfertal
Battle of Ladenburg
Battle of Hirschhorn
Battle of Waghäusel
Battle of Ladenburg
Battle of Sinsheim (1849)
Battle of Ubstadt
Battle of Durlach
Gefecht in Gernsbach
 30 June to 23 July 1849 Siege of Rastatt Fortress.

Baden Revolution